Aish may refer to:

Aish HaTorah, Orthodox Jewish outreach organization and yeshiva
Aish, South Brent, England
Aish, Stoke Gabriel, England
Aish Tor, Dartmoor, England
Aishwarya Rai, a popular Bollywood actress
Assured Income for the Severely Handicapped
James Aish (born 1995), an Australian rules footballer
Aish merahrah, an Egyptian flatbread flavored with fenugreek
 Aish (or Aish baladi), Egyptian flatbread